Harts Hill railway station was a station on the Oxford-Worcester-Wolverhampton Line. It was opened in 1895 by a GWR keen to invest in what was perceived to be the lucrative passenger area of the Black Country, and it was intended to serve the communities between Brierley Hill and Dudley. It closed, like many passenger stations, in 1917 due to the First World War, but was consequently never reopened when the passengers failed to materialise. Two railways/routes served the station - originally the Oxford, Worcester and Wolverhampton Railway and the South Staffordshire Railway, which later became the Great Western Railway and London, Midland and Scottish Railway (through amalgamation of the London and North Western Railway) respectively.

There are no remaining signs of the station, and the road from which it was accessed has long since been widened to create a dual carriageway.

It is proposed to be reopened with a Midland Metro extension which will divert from the line at this point and run through Merry Hill Shopping Centre before and join on to Dudley and then Wednesbury while heavy rail would continue onto Round Oak.

References

Disused railway stations in Dudley
Former Great Western Railway stations
Railway stations in Great Britain opened in 1895
Railway stations in Great Britain closed in 1917